Dave Radrigai (born 15 March 1990) is a Fijian footballer who plays as a midfielder for Lautoka in the Fiji National Football League.

Club career
Radrigai started his career with Lautoka. In 2014 he moved to Suva to play in the OFC Champions League with them. In 2016 he returned to Lautoka. In 2017 he won the 2017 Fiji National Football League with Lautoka, the first title in 8 years for the baby blues.

International career
Radrigai made his debut for the Fiji national football team in a 5-0 victory against Tonga on August 19, 2015. He scored his first goal on December 12, 2017 in a 4-0 victory also against Tonga.

International goals
Scores and results list Fiji's goal tally first.

References

External links

Living people
1990 births
Association football midfielders
Fiji international footballers
Fijian footballers
Suva F.C. players
Lautoka F.C. players